The Château de Bayac is a château in Bayac, Dordogne, Nouvelle-Aquitaine, France.

Châteaux in Dordogne
Monuments historiques of Dordogne